Néstor Oscar Craviotto (born 3 October 1963 in La Plata) is an Argentine football manager and former player who played as a defender. He is the current manager of Colombian club Atlético Huila.

Playing career 
He played club football for a number of teams in Argentina and represented his country on 11 occasions.

Craviotto started his professional playing career in 1983 with Estudiantes he was part of the squad that won the Nacional championship that year.

In 1989 Craviotto received his first call-up to the Argentina national team, but he missed out on selection for the 1990 World Cup.

In 1991, he joined Club Atlético Independiente and made his return to the international scene, he was part of two Copa América winning squads, in 1991 and 1993.

Craviotto won his second league championship with Independiente in the 1994 Clausura, Independiente went on to win the Supercopa Sudamericana in 1994 and 1995 and also claimed the 1995 Recopa Sudamericana.

After these successes Craviotto returned to Estudiates in 1995, he left one year later to join Club Atlético Banfield where he spent three years.

In 1999 Craviotto joined his last team, San Martín de San Juan who were playing in the Argentine 2nd division at the time.

Managerial career 
Craviotto started his managerial career shortly after retiring as a player, he then returned to Estudiantes de La Plata where he worked until 2002.

Craviotta was manager of Unión de Santa Fe between 2002 and 2003 and  Chacarita Juniors in 2003.

In 2004, he took over at Ecuadorian club Emelec but left after only seven games in charge.

Craviotto returned to Argentine football where he took over 2nd division Club Atlético Belgrano in 2005 and then had a second spell with Unión de Santa Fe. In 2006, he took over at Club Atlético Centenario in Neuquén who were playing in the regionalised 4th division but things did not go well for the club, who were relegated at the end of the 2006-2007 season.

Honours

Player

Club
 Estudiantes
Primera División Argentina: Nacional 1983

 Independiente
Primera División Argentina: Clausura 1994
Supercopa Sudamericana: 1994, 1995
Recopa Sudamericana: 1995

International
 Argentina
Copa América: 1991, 1993
FIFA Confederation Cup: 1992
Artemio Franchi Trophy: 1993

References

External links

Vende Humo profile 
Craviotta's CV 

1963 births
Living people
Footballers from La Plata
Argentine footballers
Association football defenders
Argentina international footballers
1991 Copa América players
1992 King Fahd Cup players
1993 Copa América players
Copa América-winning players
FIFA Confederations Cup-winning players
Estudiantes de La Plata footballers
Club Atlético Independiente footballers
Club Atlético Banfield footballers
San Martín de San Juan footballers
Argentine football managers
San Martín de San Juan managers
Estudiantes de La Plata managers
Unión de Santa Fe managers
Chacarita Juniors managers
Club Atlético Belgrano managers
C.S. Emelec managers
Unión La Calera managers
Deportivo Pereira managers
Atlético Bucaramanga managers
Argentine Primera División players
Expatriate football managers in Chile
Expatriate football managers in Bolivia
Expatriate football managers in Ecuador
Expatriate football managers in Guatemala
Expatriate football managers in Colombia
Atlético Huila managers